Wilber Marion Brucker (June 23, 1894 – October 28, 1968)
 was an American Republican politician. Born in Saginaw, Michigan, he served as the 32nd governor of Michigan from 1931 to 1933 and as the United States Secretary of the Army between July 21, 1955 and January 19, 1961.

Early life
Brucker was born in Saginaw, Michigan, the son of Democratic U.S. Representative Ferdinand Brucker.  He graduated from the University of Michigan Law School in 1916 and enlisted in the Michigan National Guard, serving with its 33rd Infantry Regiment on the Mexican border during the Pancho Villa Expedition from 1916 to 1917.  He attended Officer Training Camp at Fort Sheridan, Illinois, and was commissioned a second lieutenant. Brucker served in France during World War I with the 166th Infantry, 42d Division, in the Château Thierry, St. Mihiel, and Meuse-Argonne operations, 1917–1918.  He received the Silver Star and Purple Heart, and remained a member of the Officer Reserve Corps until 1937.

Politics
A Republican, after the war, Brucker was assistant prosecuting attorney of Saginaw County from 1919 to 1923, and then prosecuting attorney from 1923 to 1927. He married Clara Helen Hantel in 1923.  He served as assistant attorney general of Michigan, 1927–1928, and as Michigan Attorney General, 1928–1930.

In 1930 he was elected as Michigan's 32nd Governor, serving one term until being defeated in 1932 by Democrat William Comstock. During his two years in office, the police force in Michigan increased and a new state police headquarters in Lansing was authorized. Also Michigan enacted legislation that allowed grand juries to investigate allegations of municipal government fraud and mismanagement. In 1936, Brucker defeated incumbent U.S. Senator James Couzens in the Republican primary elections, but lost to Democrat Prentiss M. Brown in the general election.

He was a member of the law firm of Clark, Klein, Brucker, and Waples, 1937–1954, and served as General Counsel of the Department of Defense from 1954 to 1955, during the Army–McCarthy hearings.

In 1955, Brucker was appointed by U.S. President Dwight D. Eisenhower as Secretary of the Army, serving from July 21, 1955 to January 19, 1961. Brucker administered the Army during a period of major technological advance, especially in the missile-satellite field, and at a time when the Army's place in the national defense structure was overshadowed by a philosophy of "massive retaliation". Under his direction the Army instituted a five-element (pentagonal) organization concept for the division, established a Strategic Army Corps for emergency reaction, launched the United States' first satellite, Explorer I, and adopted the Army Flag.

Death
Brucker returned to legal practice in Detroit with the firm of Brucker and Brucker, 1961–1968, and was a member of the Board of Directors of Freedoms Foundation.  He died in Detroit on October 28, 1968, and was buried at Arlington National Cemetery.

Legacy
Brucker Hall at Joint Base Myer–Henderson Hall is named for him.

References

Additional resources
 
 National Governors Association
 Wilber M. Brucker Papers at the Bentley Historical Library
 Autobiography of Clara H. Brucker, wife of Wilber M. Brucker "To Have Your Cake and Eat It"

|-

|-

|-

|-

1894 births
1968 deaths
Michigan lawyers
Republican Party governors of Michigan
Michigan Attorneys General
United States Secretaries of the Army
United States Army officers
United States Army personnel of World War I
Politicians from Saginaw, Michigan
American Presbyterians
Burials at Arlington National Cemetery
University of Michigan Law School alumni
Recipients of the Silver Star
20th-century American politicians
Michigan National Guard personnel
20th-century American lawyers
Members of the Odd Fellows